The 1989 Sun Belt Conference men's basketball tournament was held March 4–6 at the Charlotte Coliseum in Charlotte, North Carolina.

Top-seeded  easily defeated  in the championship game, 105–59, to win their first Sun Belt men's basketball tournament.

The Jaguars, in turn, received an automatic bid to the 1989 NCAA tournament. No other Sun Belt members received at-large bids to the tournament.

Format
There were no changes to the existing tournament format. All eight conference members were placed into the initial quarterfinal round and each team was seeded based on its regular season conference record.

Bracket

See also
Sun Belt Conference women's basketball tournament

References

Sun Belt Conference men's basketball tournament
Tournament
Sun Belt Conference men's basketball tournament
Sun Belt Conference men's basketball tournament